The Minnesota Highway 371 Bridge is a 4-lane bridge carrying Minnesota State Highway 371 over the Mississippi River in the town of Baxter.  It opened in 2000 as part of the Hwy. 371 bypass of Brainerd.

See also
List of crossings of the Upper Mississippi River

References

Bridges over the Mississippi River
Great River Road
Road bridges in Minnesota
Concrete bridges in the United States
Girder bridges in the United States